Pistolet was a   built for the French Navy in the first decade of the 20th century. Completed in 1903, the ship was initially assigned to the Northern Squadron.

Design and description
The Arquebuse class was designed as a faster version of the preceding . The two vertical triple-expansion steam engines each drove one propeller shaft using steam provided by two du Temple Guyot or Normand boilers. Their crew consisted of four officers and fifty-eight enlisted men.

The main armament of the Arquebuse-class ships consisted of a single  gun forward of the bridge and six  Hotchkiss guns in single mounts, three on each broadside. They were fitted with two single rotating mounts for  torpedo tubes on the centerline, one between the funnels and the other on the stern.

Service history
Pistolet (Pistol) was ordered from Ateliers et Chantiers de la Loire on 22 May 1901 and the ship was laid down in September at its shipyard in Nantes. She was launched on 29 May 1903 and conducted her sea trials during from June to August that year. The ship was commissioned on 21 September after her completion. She was assigned to the Northern Squadron before completion, on 9 September, to replace the old destroyer  She was shortly thereafter transferred to French Indochina, arriving there in April 1904. She traveled there in company with the protected cruiser  and several other Arquebuse-class destroyers.

In 1911, Pistolet was serving with the Naval Division of the Far East, based in French Indochina.

World War I
The unit was based in Saigon in French Indochina. The destroyers and D'Iberville were initially sent to patrol the Strait of Malacca while the armored cruisers were sent north to join the search for the German East Asia Squadron. D'Iberville and the destroyers conducted patrols in the strait for the German unprotected cruiser , which was known to be passing through the area at the time; the French ships failed to locate the German vessel.

Pistolet was present in the harbor at Penang in the Dutch East Indies on 27 October 1914, moored alongside her sister Fronde. The other major Triple Entente ships in the harbor included D'Iberville and the Russian protected cruiser . In the early hours of 28 October, the German light cruiser  entered the harbor to attack the Entente vessels there. In the ensuing Battle of Penang, Emden quickly torpedoed and sank Zhemchug before turning to flee. Unlike the other French warships, Pistolet did not open fire on the raider, as she was moored inboard of Fronde.

In 1915, Pistolet received new boilers at Saigon, French Indochina. She returned home later that year, arriving back in Toulon on 19 January 1916. The ship was then assigned to the Western Mediterranean Patrol Division, where she operated for the next two years. The war having ended in November 1918, Pistolet was struck from the naval register on 30 October 1919 and eventually sold to ship breakers in Toulon on 6 May 1920.

References

Bibliography
 
 

 

 
 

Arquebuse-class destroyers
Ships built in France
1903 ships